Iridomyrmex lividus is a species of ant in the genus Iridomyrmex. Described by Shattuck in 1993, the ant is endemic to Australia and resembles a similar appearance to the Meat ant (Iridomyrmex purpureus).

References

Iridomyrmex
Hymenoptera of Australia
Insects described in 1993